Mohamed Marko Camara (born 5 May 1985) is a Guinean former footballer. He spent one season with Algerian side Saïda.

Career statistics

Club

Notes

References

1985 births
Living people
Guinean footballers
Association football forwards
Tunisian Ligue Professionnelle 1 players
Algerian Ligue Professionnelle 1 players
Fello Star players
CA Bizertin players
MC Saïda players
Guinean expatriate footballers
Guinean expatriate sportspeople in Tunisia
Expatriate footballers in Tunisia
Expatriate footballers in Algeria
Sportspeople from Conakry